The women's 100 metres hurdles at the 2011 Asian Athletics Championships was held at the Kobe Universiade Memorial Stadium on 10 July.

Medalists

Results

Heats
First 3 in each heat (Q) and the next 2 best performers (q) advanced to the final.

Wind:Heat 1: –0.8 m/s, Heat 2: –0.6 m/s

Final
Wind: –0.9 m/s

References
Results

100 metres hurdles
Sprint hurdles at the Asian Athletics Championships
2011 in women's athletics